is a Japanese ultramarathon and marathon runner from Sagamihara, Kanagawa. He is a four-time IAU 24 Hour World Championship winner, which makes him the athlete with the most wins in the event.

Other notable wins of Sekiya include eight wins at the IAU-endorsed Soochow International Ultra-Marathon held in Taipei. He first won the event in 2001, and won in seven consecutive years in 2005, 2007, 2008, 2009, 2010, 2011, and 2012 (there was no event in 2006).

Sekiya won the  Spartathlon Ultra Race in Greece in 2002 and 2009.

International competitions

References

1967 births
Living people
Japanese ultramarathon runners
Japanese male marathon runners
Japanese male long-distance runners
People from Sagamihara
Male ultramarathon runners
Sportspeople from Kanagawa Prefecture